The Bassendean Fire Station, at 10-14 Parker Street, Bassendean, Western Australia, is a historic fire station.

It is a one-storey brick and tile building, with elements of Inter-War Stripped Classical architecture styling, from its construction in 1934 and expansion in 1969–71.  The listing included outbuildings and a ladder training tower at the rear.

The station closed in 2013, after the Department of Fire and Emergency Services moved services to Kiara.

It was listed by the Heritage Council on the State Register of Western Australia.

See also
List of State Register of Heritage Places in the Town of Bassendean

References

Fire stations in Western Australia
State Register of Heritage Places in the Town of Bassendean
Bassendean, Western Australia